Castillon-en-Couserans (literally Castillon in Couserans) is a commune in the Ariège department in southwestern France.

Personalities
Pierre Soulé (1801 – 1870), U.S. politician and diplomat, was born there.

Population

See also
Communes of the Ariège department

References

Communes of Ariège (department)
Ariège communes articles needing translation from French Wikipedia